Prado de San Sebastián is a station of the Seville Metro on the line 1. It is also an interurban bus station, and a tram stop of the MetroCentro line. It is located at the intersection of Carlos V, Portugal, Menéndez y Pelayo Av. and San Fernando St. in the district of Casco Antiguo. Prado de San Sebastián is an underground station situated between Puerta Jerez and San Bernardo on the same line. It was opened on April 2, 2009. It is expected that by 2017 the station will have a connection with line 3 of the subway, which is still in the planning phase.

Connections
Bus: 1, 5, 21, 22, 25, 26, 28, 29, 30, 31, 34, 37, 41, C1, C2, C3, C4, EA, M-121, M-122, M-123, M-131, M-132, M-13B, M-133, M-124, M-220, M-221Tram: MetroCentro (T1)

See also
 List of Seville metro stations

References

External links 
  Official site.
 History, construction details and maps.

Seville Metro stations
Railway stations in Spain opened in 2009